Yerrasanivari Banjar (YS.Banjar)
is a small village located adjacent to medium water project called as Lanka Sagar. It comes under the Mandal of Vemsoor in Andhra Pradesh.

History

Library 

The library of Yerrasanivari Banjar village has started with the support of its alumni especially Apps.

Administration 

The village is administrated by panchayat raj system. Due to very less population officials combined Yerrasanivari Banjar with other villages adjacent to it like Guduru, Moddulugudem  to form one panchayath, The elections for this is going to conduct on 26 July 2013.

References 

Villages in Khammam district